Velayudham is a 2011 Indian Tamil-language superhero film written and directed by Mohan Raja. It stars Vijay in titular role with Genelia while Hansika, Santhanam, Saranya Mohan, Soori, Abhimanyu Singh, and Vineet Kumar in other prominent roles. The music was composed by Vijay Antony and cinematography by Priyan.

The film revolves around a villager who arrives in the city to collect money and is persuaded by a journalist to take on the disguise of Velayudham, a superhero, to eradicate the evils in the society, such as corruption and terrorism. Its story was adapted from the 2000 Telugu film Azad.

Velayudham was released on 26 October 2011, and became commercially successful. The film collected 60 crore.

Plot
A young journalist named Bharathi, along with two of her friends, investigates a series of terrorist attacks which have taken place in Chennai and also illegal activities like human trafficking. When they are caught video-recording illicit activities happening in a secluded house one night by a group of thugs, they attempt to flee from them. While Bharathi's friends are killed, Bharathi manages to escape despite being stabbed by one of the thugs, but after the attack on Bharathi and her friends, the thugs' vehicle explodes due to a small mishap when a lit cigarette falls over petrol packets stored in the vehicle, killing all the thugs. Bharathi comes up with a new idea to eradicate society's evils by creating and propagating a fictional character called "Velayudham" (Lord Muruga) after seeing Lord Muruga's temple nearby who wants to clean up the city of terrorism and other illegal activities.

It shifts to a village called Pavunoor, where a milk vendor named Velayudham alias Velu is residing with his younger sister Kaveri, whom he loves dearly along with his cousin Vaidehi. One day, Velu, Kaveri, and Vaidehi leave for Chennai to collect money from a chit fund for Kaveri's marriage. At the Chennai Egmore railway station, Velu's handbag is stolen by Speedu, a petty thief. Velu pursues Speedu on a motorbike parked at the station and manages to get back his money, but moments after alighting from the bike, the bike explodes. The parked bike had a bomb which was meant to ensure a terrorist attack at the railway station, and thus, Velu inadvertently thwarted a deadly terrorist attack which would have killed several people. After a few more incidents where Velu unknowingly prevents more terrorist attacks, he comes to Bharathi's attention. At first she hates him due to various incidents But when she saw him unknowingly handing over the terrorists to the police, she falls in love with him without knowing that Vaidehi also loves him. When she learns that he unknowingly prevented the attacks, she convinces him to take up the role of Velayudham and provide hope to the people. But he refuses to do it and tells her to finish of the avatar of Velayudham. Soon he learns that his money is stolen and the company where he insured the money was a corrupt company. The people gets angry when they learn that the company is a corrupt company and their money stolen. One of them commits suicide by burning himself alive as he need money for his daughter's operation and if he didn't get the money his daughter would die. Velu tries to save him but it fails. When the villagers tells that Velayudham will come and help them he plans to take the role of Velayudham. He kills the person who stole his and the people's money and returns the money to the people. In the avatar of Velayudham, Velu starts to eradicate the evils that pertain within the society, such as corruption, prostitution, and terrorism, among others. He soon gains wide support and acceptance among the public and even the police.

A few months later, Velu returns to Pavunoor with Bharathi for Kaveri's marriage. Unknown to Velayudham, Musafir Ibrahim, who is the leader of a terrorist group followed him to his village. Ibrahim wants to kill him since he, in the guise of Velayudham had thwarted every terrorist attack that he had planned in Chennai. On the day of Kaveri's marriage, a bomb planted by Ibrahim at Velu's house explodes, killing Kaveri.

A few days after Kaveri's death, a grieving Velu learns from Bharathi that Ulaganathan, the corrupt Home Minister of Tamil Nadu, is indirectly responsible for the terrorist attacks and Kaveri's death. Ulaganathan allowed Ibrahim to carry out terrorist attacks in exchange for money. He even tries to gain popularity by claiming Velayudham as his idea, planning to reveal Ibrahim as Velayudham's real identity in a function at the Nehru Stadium, Chennai. Velu returns to Chennai, kills Ibrahim, exposes Ulaganathan's misdeeds. Ulaganathan is killed in a stampede and Velu returns to his village, promising that he will return as Velayudham again.

Cast

Production

Casting
The film launched on 15 July 2010 at Madras University campus. Hansika Motwani was chosen for a female lead role,  while Saranya Mohan would play the sister of Vijay's character. Genelia D'Souza was chosen as a journalist, Art director Veera Samar also was roped in to play a journalist. While Santhanam and M. S. Baskar were chosen to play the comedy leads in the film, Sayaji Shinde, Vineetkumar and Abhimanyu Singh were selected to play negative roles. Tom Delmar, who had worked as a stunt coordinator in several Hollywood films, joined the crew to choreograph the stunts in the film. Due to his commitment to Velayudham, Vijay almost lost his role in S. Shankar's Nanban. He had walked out of Nanban, since the two films demanded two completely different looks; however, he joined the film later as the scenes involving the protagonist were reserved to be shot later. R. T. Neason who earlier directed Muruga (2007) and went on to direct Vijay in Jilla (2014), worked as a second unit director.

Filming
Filming was carried out primarily at three locations, Southern Tamil Nadu, Kerala and the last schedule in Chennai. A song sequence choreographed by Shobi that was originally to be shot in Switzerland was canned in Srinagar, Jammu and Kashmir, with Genelia and Hansika filming alongside Vijay.

Tom Delmar, the stunt co-ordinator of projects such as Braveheart, was behind the shooting of an extremely tricky train sequence for Velayudham. It was shot on a train moving on a bridge Vijay performed the risky sequence coolly. The director said, "A slight miss and the actor could fall 100 feet below! A very risky sequence, but Vijay did it coolly. My heart was in my mouth when it was being filmed". This stunt was performed in the location Rayagada in Orissa. Another fight sequence was filmed at Golkonda fort, Hyderabad.

The audiography was done by M. R. Rajakrishnan, and the film's dubbing was done in Four Frames Recording Studio in Chennai.

Themes and influences
The film has been widely reported to be a remake of the 2000 Telugu film Azad that starred Soundarya as a journalist and Nagarjuna as a villager, incidentally the roles played by Genelia and Vijay, respectively. However, director M. Raja claimed that it was not a remake but his own story. He later admitted that Azad served as the inspiration and that he had penned a new screenplay. Vijay had signed up to appear in a village action story titled Velan in 2001 to be directed by Thirupathisamy, the director of Azad, which was postponed indefinitely after the death of the director. Raja told his cast that it was inspired by Azad and requested them to not watch the original. It became Raja's first Tamil venture which did not include his brother in the cast and while writing the script, Raja analysed Vijay's popularity amongst children and women audience to insert certain scenes into the script. The film told the tale of a milkman who turns into a vigilante, with a human interest story as a backdrop. Post the film's release, Raja said that his brother Jayam Ravi had help him in improving the script. Another reported influence for the film was the superhero costume worn by Vijay's character, which was believed to have been borrowed from the Assassin's Creed video game series, bearing a resemblance to the robes of young Altaïr, one of the protagonists in the series, leading to criticism of the film being "copied" from the video game. The film 7aum Arivu, which had released alongside Velayudham was also compared with the game. Sudhish Kamath compared Velayudham to the Pink Panther films for featuring a series of "unintentional world-saving incidents".

Music

Harris Jayaraj was initially approached to compose music for the film. However he declined citing scheduling conflicts, subsequently promising Vijay that he would score his next, which eventually became S. Shankar's Nanban. After Harris declined, the soundtrack was composed by Vijay Antony. The audio rights were bought by Sony Music for a huge amount. The soundtrack consisted of six tracks and was released on 31 August 2011, at CSI Grounds in Madurai, attended by thousands of Vijay fans. Vijay, Hansika Motwani, S. A. Chandrasekhar, Vijay Antony, Viveka, and several distributors and theatre owners were present in the function. In a press statement Ashok Parwani, Sony Music Entertainment Chennai, said, "We are overwhelmed with the response the movie and the music have received. Velayudham has broken all records and we have sold all our units within a day of its launch. The soundtracks are original, soulful and memorable. We're sure that the compositions will go down in history as some of the best melodies of our times."

Critical response
Pavithra Srinivasan of Rediff gave it 3 out of 5, stating "Vijay Antony plays it safe mostly, with the result that there's nothing new." P. G. Devi from Behindwoods gave it 3 out of 5 and said, "Vijay Antony continues to flaunt his success this time around with Velayutham. The album has a bunch of entertaining soundtrack like, 'Molachu moonu', 'Mayam Seidhayo' and usual mass beat tracks 'Sonna Puriyadhu' and 'Vela Vela'." Prakash Upadhyaya from Oneindia.in said, "Vijay Antony's music has met the expectations of the audience. The album has all kinds of songs and the music director has targeted the mass as well as class listeners". Indiaglitz said "the music album [...] presents us a variety fare, however with the main target being the 'mass audience'", labelling it as a "food festival for the appetite of Vijay fans, who are craving for mass masala numbers from their hero".

Release

Theatrical
The film was initially supposed to be released on 22 June, coinciding with Vijay's birthday, but was postponed due to a delay in production.

Velayudham released on 26 October 2011, during the Diwali festival and had a tough competition with Ra.One and 7aum Arivu. The film was released with over 820 prints worldwide. It also saw a release in about 100 theaters in Karnataka and 120 theaters in Kerala.

In the UK, the film was sent for censor certification and with a running time of 117 minutes, received a 12A classification from the British Board of Film Classification. However, the distributor added extra 22 minutes of uncensored footage for theatrical release, eventually resulting in all show cancellations at Cineworld.

Legal issue
Karnataka Rakshana Vedike (KRV), a pro-Kannada outfit, requested all the theatres in the state not to screen any non-Kannada film on the occasion of Kannada Rajyaotsava Day, but some of the cinema halls did not take their plea seriously, which irked the KRV activists to show their anger against the Tamil film. However, the theatre authorities realised that the situation might reach out of control and hence, they agreed to cancel all the shows of the day. The film was distributed by producer K Manju in Karnataka.

Distribution
As per overseas distributor Ayngaran International, the film released in 17 theatres in UK. The US theatrical rights were acquired by GK Media.

Home media
The satellite rights of the film were sold to Jaya TV for a price of 4 crore. Overseas DVD were marketed by Ayngaran DVD. The satellite rights of the Malayalam dubbed version were given to Surya TV and the satellite rights to the Hindi dubbed version went to Colors Cineplex.

Reception

Critical response
Velayudham received positive reviews from critics. Sify gave the film 4 out of 5 and called it a good value for the money ("paisa vassol"), stating that the film was a "perfect outing with family, but [is] far too long". Rediff.com gave the film 3.5 out of 5, and called it a "paisa vassol film" CNN-IBN defined the film as a "must watch" and "treat for Vijay fans". Indiaglitz labelled it a "racy entertainer this Deepavali season" and cited it was a "right choice for the festival mood". The Times of India gave the film 3.5 out of 5 stars, and concluded that Velayudham is sure to add to his box-office muscle. Behinds woods named the film a "Complete mass entertainer spiced up by Vijay" and gave the film 3 out of 5 as well. Similarly Oneindia.in described it as a "complete masala entertainer", highlighting its story and "amazing action-sequences" with a rating of 4 out of five stars. Nowrunning.com rated it 3.5/5, writing: "Velayudham, part comedy part action sails through both streams smoothly until it is struck and sunk by crude melodrama". The Hindu stated that the film "simply enters and entertains" and that Raja had "churned out reasonably engaging fare", adding that it had a "strong story, a neat screenplay arresting action, admirable dance movements, one or two hum-worthy numbers and the ever-helpful sister sentiment". Indo-Asian News Service gave the film 3.5 out of 5, citing that it "defies all logic, but has the magic of the star called Vijay". Ananda Vikatan rated the film 42 out of 100.

Box office

India
Velayudham took a big opening on Diwali day. The film topped the overseas box office, forcing the producers to release more prints. In its opening weekend, spanning five days, the film grossed 2.1 crore in Chennai. According to trade sources, the film grossed 19 crore in Tamil Nadu and around 40 crore during the first week worldwide. On 28 October 2011, two days after its release, Vijay, Vijay Antony and director Raja met the press at a hotel in Chennai to celebrate the success of the film. The total collections in Chennai amounted to 7.75 crore in seven weeks. Velayudham also grossed 5.20 crore in Kerala during its complete run.

Overseas
Velayudham was a relatively high grosser in Europe and North America, with Taran Adarsh, a Bollywood film critic highlighting that the film was "rocking internationally". Velayudham collected a total of £5,244 in UK. In Australia too, the film collected
A$7,175.

Accolades
Velayudham was honored with the Best Film Award at V4 Entertainment Awards 2011. Velayudham won the honours in the Best Musician category too. Actor Vijay received Edison Award for Best Actor and Superstar Rajini Award in the year 2012 for Velayudham.
Vijay received the "Hero of the year" award at the 7th Variety award 2011 held on 16 December 2012.

References

External links
 
 

2011 masala films
2011 films
2010s Tamil-language films
2010s Indian superhero films
Films directed by Mohan Raja
Films scored by Vijay Antony
Film superheroes
Indian action films
Films shot in Kerala
Films shot in Jammu and Kashmir
Films shot in Hyderabad, India
Films about terrorism in India
Tamil remakes of Telugu films
2011 action films
Indian superhero films